In Norwegian folklore, Selma is a legendary sea serpent said to live in the  Lake Seljord in Seljord, Vestfold og Telemark, Norway.

The sea serpent Selma has been depicted in the coat of arms of Seljord since 1989. Designed by sculpturer, Trygve Magnus Barstad, the arms show Selma in a gold-color on a red background.

The sea serpent has been discussed for a long time and there have been witness descriptions of encounters, especially on hot, quiet summers. The oldest written account of the creature dates from 1750, when it was said to have rounded a rowboat belonging to a man from Bø rowing across from Ulvenes to Nes.

References

External links 

 Article from Aftenposten
 TV2 (Norwegian, 2012)

Sea serpents
Culture in Vestfold og Telemark
Norwegian legends
Scandinavian legendary creatures
Seljord
Water monsters